The Women's 25 metre pistol event at the 2008 Olympic Games took place on August 13 at the Beijing Shooting Range Hall. It was won by the reigning World champion, Chen Ying of the host nation, while Otryadyn Gündegmaa won Mongolia's second Olympic medal in shooting ahead of Munkhbayar Dorjsuren who won its first, 16 years earlier, but now competes for Germany.

The event consisted of two rounds: a qualifier and a final. In the qualifier, each shooter fired 60 shots with a pistol at 25 metres distance. Scores for each shot were in increments of 1, with a maximum score of 10. The first 30 shots were in the precision stage, with series of 5 shots being shot within 5 minutes. The second set of 30 shots gave shooters 3 seconds to take each shot.

The top 8 shooters in the qualifying round moved on to the final round. There, they fired an additional 20 shots. These shots scored in increments of .1, with a maximum score of 10.9. They were fired in four sets of 5 rapid fire shots. The total score from all 80 shots was used to determine final ranking.

Records
Prior to this competition, the existing world and Olympic records were as follows.

Qualification round
The precision stage was fired at 09:00 China Standard Time (UTC+8), with all participants fitting into a single relay. In this stage, the time limit for each five-shot string is five minutes. Sonia Franquet of Spain took a two-point lead.

The rapid fire stage was fired at 12:00, with all participants fitting into a single relay. In this stage, the shooter must fire one shot each within three-second time frames, and the arm must be held at a 45 degree angle until the lights turn green, signalling the beginning of these time frames. To compensate for the shorter time, the score zones are larger than in the precision round. Mongolia's Otryadyn Gündegmaa shot 29 tens and only 1 nine, taking the overall lead and equalling the Olympic record for the qualification round that Tao Luna had set in Sydney (as opposed to Gündegmaa's 291+299, Tao had shot her record 299+291).

EOR Equalled Olympic record – PR Precision stage – Q Qualified for final – RF Rapid fire stage

Final
The final round consisted of four additional five-shot rapid fire strings. As the final rules had changed since 2004, the winner was guaranteed to establish a new Olympic record.

OR Olympic record

Shooting at the 2008 Summer Olympics
Olymp
Women's events at the 2008 Summer Olympics